Ahmed Khan may refer to:

 Ahmed Khan bin Küchük (died 1481), Khan of the Great Horde between 1465 and 1481
 Ahmed Khan (choreographer) (born 1974), Indian choreographer, producer, actor, director and writer
 Ahmed Khan (cricketer) (born 2004), Pakistani cricketer
 Ahmed Khan (field hockey) (1912–1967), Indian field hockey player
 Ahmed Khan (footballer) (1926–2017), Indian footballer
 Ahmed Khan of Herat, ruler of Herat, Afghanistan
 Malik Ahmed Khan (before 1932 - after 1973), Pakistani cricket player and umpire
 Syed Ahmad Khan (1817–1898), Anglo–Indian Muslim philosopher, pragmatist, and social activist of nineteenth century India
 Ahmed Ali Khan (born 1977), Indian businessman and politician
 Ahmed Khan (politician), Pakistani politician
 Ahmed Zahur Khan (born 1918), Pakistani shot putter and discus thrower

See also
 Ahmad Khan (disambiguation)